Big River or Big Rivers may refer to:

Geography

Rivers
In Australia
 Big River (Brodribb River, Victoria), a tributary of the Brodribb River, in Victoria
 Big River (Goulburn River, Victoria), a tributary of the Goulburn River, in Victoria
 Big River (Mitta Mitta River, Victoria), a tributary of the Mitta Mitta River, in Victoria

In New Zealand
 Big River (Buller), a tributary of the Blackwater River (Little Grey River tributary)
 Big River (Grey)
 Big River (Southland)
 Big River (Tasman)

In the United States
 Big River (Alaska), a tributary of the Kuskokwim River
 Big River (California)
 Big River (Michigan)
 Big River (Missouri)
 Big River (New Hampshire)
 Big River (Oregon)
 Big River (Rhode Island)
 Big River (Washington)
 Big River (Wisconsin)

In Canada
 Big River (Saskatchewan), a river in Saskatchewan

Communities
Canada
Big River, New Brunswick, Canada
Big River, Saskatchewan, Canada
Rural Municipality of Big River No. 555, Saskatchewan, Canada
New Zealand
Big River, New Zealand, abandoned mining town on the West Coast
United States
Big River, California, United States
Mendocino, California, formerly Big River

Other places
Big Rivers (wine), a grape-growing zone in New South Wales, Australia
Big Rivers Region, a region of the Northern Territory, Australia
Big Rivers Regional Trail, a rail trail in Dakota County, Minnesota, U.S.

Music
 Big River (musical), a 1985 musical by Roger Miller based on Mark Twain's novel Adventures of Huckleberry Finn
 Big River (album), an album by Troy Cassar-Daley
 Big River, an album by Jimmy Nail
 "Big River" (Jimmy Nail song)
 "Big River" (Johnny Cash song)
 "Big River", a song by Van Halen from the album A Different Kind of Truth

Film and TV
 Big River (film), a 2006 film featuring Joe Odagiri
 "Big River", an episode of the TV series Dora the Explorer

Other uses
Big Rivers Australian Football League, an Australian rules football competition in the Northern Territory
Big Rivers Conference, a high school athletic conference in Western Wisconsin
Big Rivers Conference (Illinois), a high school football conference, 1999–2012

See also
 
 Mississippi River (derived from Native American names meaning Big River), the largest river system in North America
 Rio Grande (literal English translation: Big River), a river that forms part of the MexicoUnited States border
 Guadalquivir (derived from Arabic الوادي الكبير: Big River), the fifth-longest river in Spain and most important in Andalusia